Quaternium-15 (systematic name: hexamethylenetetramine chloroallyl chloride) is a quaternary ammonium salt that has been used as a surfactant and preservative. It acts as an antimicrobial agent because it slowly releases formaldehyde, which is a preservative with biocidal properties.

Both quaternium-15 and formaldehyde release agents have been the subjects of controversy.  They are often banned in US and Europe. 

It can be found under a variety of names, including Dow Chemical Company: Dowicil 200 (cis isomer only), Dowicil 75 and Dowicil 100 (both a mix of cis and trans isomers).

Synthesis
Quaternium-15 can be prepared by treating hexamethylenetetramine with 1,3-dichloropropene.  A mixture of cis and trans isomers are produced.

Applications
The isolated cis-compound is used primarily in cosmetic applications, with a maximum permitted concentration in the EU of 0.2%. The mixed product (cis- and trans-) is used in a wider range of formulations such as: emulsifiable metal-cutting fluids, latex and emulsion paints, liquid floor polishes and floor waxes, and glues and adhesives.

Safety concerns 

Quaternium-15 has been banned in the EU since 2017 and a bill is under consideration in the US.

Allergic reaction 
Quaternium-15 is an allergen, and can cause dermatitis. Many of those with an allergy to quaternium-15 are also allergic to formaldehyde. At low pHs, it would be expected to release significant amounts of formaldehyde due to acid hydrolysis via the Delepine reaction. Allergic sensitivity to quaternium-15 can be detected using a patch test.
It is the single most often found cause of allergic contact dermatitis of the hands (16.5% in 959 cases). In 2005–06, it was the fourth-most-prevalent allergen in patch tests (10.3%).

Although quaternium-15 releases low amounts of formaldehyde. Even so, Johnson & Johnson announced plans to phase out its use of quaternium-15 in cosmetic products by 2015 in response to consumer pressure.

See also 
 Polyquaternium

References

External links
 
 
 Occupational Hazards - Quaternium-15

Cosmetics chemicals
Preservatives
Quaternary ammonium compounds